A campus novel, also known as an academic novel, is a novel whose main action is set in and around the campus of a university. The genre in its current form dates back to the early 1950s. The Groves of Academe by Mary McCarthy, published in 1952, is often quoted as the earliest example, although in Faculty Towers: The Academic Novel and Its Discontents, Elaine Showalter discusses C. P. Snow's The Masters, of the previous year, and several earlier novels have an academic setting and the same characteristics, such as Willa Cather's The Professor's House of 1925, Régis Messac's Smith Conundrum first published between 1928 and 1931 and Dorothy L. Sayers' Gaudy Night of 1935 (see below).

Many well-known campus novels, such as Kingsley Amis's Lucky Jim and those of David Lodge, are comic or satirical, often counterpointing intellectual pretensions and human weaknesses. Some, however, attempt a serious treatment of university life; examples include C. P. Snow's The Masters, J. M. Coetzee's Disgrace, Philip Roth's The Human Stain, and Norene Moskalski's Nocturne, Opus 1: Sea Foam.  The novels are usually told from the viewpoint of a faculty member (e.g.,  Lucky Jim) or the viewpoint of a student (e.g., Tom Wolfe's I Am Charlotte Simmons).  Novels such as Evelyn Waugh's Brideshead Revisited that focus on students rather than faculty are often considered to belong to a distinct genre, sometimes termed varsity novels.

A subgenre is the campus murder mystery, where the closed university setting substitutes for the country house of Golden Age detective novels; examples include Dorothy L. Sayers' Gaudy Night, Edmund Crispin's Gervase Fen mysteries, Carolyn Gold Heilbrun's Kate Fansler mysteries and Colin Dexter's The Silent World of Nicholas Quinn.

Themes 
Campus novels exploit the fictional possibilities created by a closed environment of the university, with idiosyncratic characters inhabiting unambiguous hierarchies. They may describe the reaction of a fixed socio-cultural perspective (the academic staff) to new social attitudes (the new student intake).

Examples 
 The Masters by C. P. Snow (1951)
 The Groves of Academe by Mary McCarthy (1952)
 Lucky Jim by Kingsley Amis (1954)
 Pictures from an Institution by Randall Jarrell (1954)
 Anglo-Saxon Attitudes by Angus Wilson (1956)
 Pnin by Vladimir Nabokov (1957)
 A New Life by Bernard Malamud (1961)
 Stoner by John Williams (1965)
 The Sterile Cuckoo by John Nichols (1965)
 Been Down So Long It Looks Like Up to Me  by Richard Farina (1966) 
 Giles Goat-Boy, Or, The Revised New Syllabus by John Barth (1966)
 Other Men's Daughters by Richard G. Stern (1973)
 The War Between the Tates by Alison Lurie (1974)
 Porterhouse Blue by Tom Sharpe (1974)
 Changing Places by David Lodge (1975)
 The History Man by Malcolm Bradbury (1975)
 The Silent World of Nicholas Quinn (The Morse Series) by Colin Dexter (1977)
 The Professor of Desire by Philip Roth (1977) 
 La Polka piqué by Maurice Couturier 1982
 The Big U by Neal Stephenson (1984)
 Small World by David Lodge (1984)
 White Noise by Don DeLillo (1985)
 Crossing to Safety by Wallace Stegner (1987)
 The Rules of Attraction by Bret Easton Ellis (1987)
 Nice Work by David Lodge (1988)
 Possession: A Romance by A. S. Byatt (1990)
 The Crown of Columbus by Louise Erdrich and Michael Dorris (1991)
 The Secret History by Donna Tartt (1992)
 Tam Lin by Pamela Dean (1992)
 Japanese by Spring by Ishmael Reed (1993)
 Galatea 2.2 by Richard Powers (1995)
 Wonder Boys by Michael Chabon (1995)
 Moo by Jane Smiley (1995)
 Death Is Now My Neighbour (The Morse Series) by Colin Dexter (1996)
 Making History by Stephen Fry (1996)
 As She Climbed Across the Table by Jonathan Lethem (1997)
 Straight Man by Richard Russo (1997)
 Disgrace by J.M. Coetzee (1999)
 The Human Stain by Philip Roth (2000)
 Thinks ... by David Lodge (2001)
 The Lecturer's Tale by James Hynes (2001)
 Starter for Ten by David Nicholls (2003)
 The Tatami Galaxy by Tomihiko Morimi (2004)
 I Am Charlotte Simmons by Tom Wolfe (2004)
 On Beauty by Zadie Smith (2005)
 Indignation by Philip Roth (2008)
 Invisible by Paul Auster (2009)
 The Marriage Plot by Jeffrey Eugenides (2011)
 The Art of Fielding by Chad Harbach (2011)
 Death of the Black-Haired Girl by Robert Stone (2013)
 Cow Country by Adrian Jones Pearson (2015)
 Normal People by Sally Rooney (2018)Ninth House by Leigh Bardugo (2019)
 Real Life by Brandon Taylor (2020)
 Love & Virtue by Diana Reid (2021)

 See also 

 School and university in literature
 Bildungsroman

 Notes and references 

 Bibliography 
 Anderson, Christian K. & John R. Thelin (2009). “Campus Life Revealed: Tracking Down the Rich Resources of American Collegiate Fiction.” Journal of Higher Education 80(1), 106-113.
Kenneth Womack: Academic Satire: The Campus Novel in Context in A Companion to the British and Irish Novel 1945-2000 (Blackwell Publishing 2005)Merriam-Webster's Encyclopedia of Literature. Merriam-Webster 1995,  (eingeschränkte Online-Version (Google Books))
McGurl, Mark. "The Program Era: Pluralisms in Postwar American Fiction."  Critical Inquiry 32.1 (Autumn 2005): 102-109.
Showalter, Elaine. Faculty Towers: The Academic Novel and Its Discontents  (OUP; 2005)
Carter, Ian. Ancient Cultures of Conceit: British University Fiction in the Post-War Years (Routledge, Chapman & Hall; 1990)
Philippe Chardin. Alma Mater - premier roman comique inspiré par l'université française, Paris, Atlantica-Séguier, 2000.
Dorie LaRue. Learning Curves, 2011.

 External links 
Edemariam A. 'Who's afraid of the campus novel?' Guardian, 2 Oct 2004
Lodge D. 'Exiles in a small world' Guardian, 8 May 2004
Showalter E. 'What I read and what I read for' & 'The Fifties: Ivory towers' (from Faculty Towers: The Academic Novel and Its Discontents'')
Flavorwire. 'The Fifty Greatest Campus Novels Ever written.' (Elizabeth Spiers, Editorial Director)

Education in popular culture
Literary genres